Kenneth Liddle (6 October 1928 – 21 January 1998) was an English footballer who played as an inside forward in the Football League for Darlington. He was on the books of Sunderland without playing League football for the club, and also played non-league football for Spennymoor United. Liddle joined Darlington from Sunderland at the end of the 1949–50 season on a free transfer. He made only one senior appearance for Darlington, replacing Harry Clark at inside left for the visit to Crewe Alexandra on 27 January 1951 in the Third Division North; Darlington lost 5–0. He went on to play for Spennymoor United.

References

1928 births
1998 deaths
Footballers from Gateshead
English footballers
Association football defenders
Sunderland A.F.C. players
Darlington F.C. players
Spennymoor United F.C. players
English Football League players